This is a list of VTV dramas released in 2018.

←2017 – 2018 – 2019→

VTV Special Tet dramas 
This drama airs from 13:10 to 14:00, 30th to 3rd Tet holiday on VTV1.

VTV1 Weeknight Prime-time dramas 
Note: Starting 26 Nov, this time slot becomes a new time frame produced by VFC.

Monday-Wednesday dramas 
These dramas air from 20:45 to 21:35, Monday to Wednesday on VTV1.

Thursday-Friday dramas 
These dramas air from 20:45 to 21:35, Thursday and Friday on VTV1.

VTV3 Weeknight Prime-time dramas

First line-up 
These dramas air from 20:00 to 20:30, Monday to Thursday on VTV3.

Second line-up

Monday-Tuesday dramas 
These dramas air from 21:40 to 22:30, Monday and Tuesday on VTV3.
Note: Because the movie Mộng phù hoa has been temporarily suspended, this time frame has ended after its final episode.
 Starting from 11 Jun, the movie Ngày ấy mình đã yêu has aired and becomes a new time frame produced by VFC.

Wednesday–Thursday dramas 
These dramas air from 21:50 to 22:40, Wednesday and Thursday on VTV3.

VTV3 Weekend Afternoon dramas 
Starting in 2018, no more dramas in Rubic 8 time slot. New time slot was opened as a collaboration of VTV and MegaGS.

These dramas air from 14:00 to 14:50, Saturday and Sunday on VTV3.

Non-recurring dramas 
These dramas were warehoused and now released on VTV channels in the time slot that's originally made for playback dramas.

See also 
 List of dramas broadcast by Vietnam Television (VTV)
 List of dramas broadcast by Hanoi Radio Television (HanoiTV)
 List of dramas broadcast by Vietnam Digital Television (VTC)
List of television programmes broadcast by Vietnam Television (VTV)

References

External links 
VTV.gov.vn – Official VTV Website 
VTV.vn – Official VTV Online Newspaper 

Vietnam Television original programming
2018 in Vietnamese television